The Warehouse Studio is a multi-media recording facility and photography studio in Vancouver, British Columbia, Canada, owned by Bryan Adams.

Building 
Originally built by the Oppenheimer Brothers in June 1886 as Vancouver's first wholesale grocery business, it also served as Vancouver's City Hall after the city was decimated by fire. For most of its 115+ year history the building held a glass factory and storage warehouse for Pilkington Glass Company.

The building later fell into terrible disrepair and became abandoned. In 1989 the property at 100-102 Powell St. was purchased by Bryan Adams.

The building at 102 Powell was gutted and converted into a parking lot with green space hidden behind a street front facade. The 2nd building, the original Oppenheimer Warehouse on the corner was restored and converted into a three-storey state of the art studio. Importantly, Adams was sure to maintain the building's character and charm by preserving the original brick and beam construction. The project took nearly a decade to complete.

In 1998, The Warehouse Studio received a City of Vancouver Heritage Award for outstanding restoration of a historic building.

Studios

Studio 1 - SSL 4072 G+ 
On the main floor is a large format analog mixing room with a 72 input Solid State Logic G Series console with Total Recall and Black E Series EQ. It also has an isolated recording space and a small lounge and kitchen.

This console was previously installed in the basement of Bryan Adams' former West Vancouver residence on Mathers Avenue. While he was on tour, Adams would allow other bands to record and mix there until his plan to create a studio complex in the heart of Vancouver could be realized.

Studio 2 - Neve A6630 
Located on the second floor is the main tracking room. The dimensions of the live room are 32 ft by 58 ft with a 24-ft ceiling and three isolation booths. There is also a lounge area, a long table for dining, full kitchen services, and a small fire escape patio.

Neve A6630 console 
The Neve A6630 installed in Studio 2 is one of the three legendary custom-ordered consoles built for Sir George Martin. Built in 1979, it was installed in AIR Studios London on Oxford Street. It later found a home in Atlantic Studios in New York, until Bryan bought it in 1991. Ron Obvious rebuilt and modded the console and it was installed into Studio 2.

It is a split console, with 58 channels, 24 busses, and a 32 channel tape monitor panel (58x24x32). The mic pres are remote, meaning the actual preamps (34427 modules) are housed in rolling carts on the live room floor. The mic trim pot on the console sends a control voltage to the pre. The main 52 channels have 31106 EQ modules.

Console Modifications include:
 Six custom "Sleve" strips: an SSL mic pre and EQ circuitry housed in a Neve channel strip.
 SSL quad buss compressor
 Pre-eq insert points

Studio 3 - Avid S6 
Studio 3 was originally a mixing studio that featured a Solid State Logic 9080J series console. In October 2013 the large analog SSL was shut down and sold off to make way for renovations and a change in the function of the studio. 12 months later the 3rd floor studio reopened with a new floor plan that now includes an isolated recording and more spacious control room. Most of the processing equipment stayed but the centre piece is now a 24 fader Avid S6 controller with 32 hardware inserts.

Studio 4 
Also on the main floor, the smallest of the studios was designed and built with budget conscious artists in mind but still features top quality equipment like Neve 1081 mic pre amps and Pro Tools HD.

Technical 
Acoustic and technical considerations for The Warehouse Studio during design, construction and operation were handled by Ron "Obvious" Vermeulen with Adams providing guidance on the character and aesthetic details. When Ron "O" retired in 2003 his long time mentor John Vrtacic took over as Technical Director for 6 years until he died in August 2009. Vrtacic's apprentice David Backus is now the Technical Director.

Credits 

 AC/DC - Stiff Upper Lip, Black Ice, Rock or Bust, Power Up
 Airbourne - No Guts. No Glory.
 Bryan Adams - 18 til I Die, Room Service, On a Day Like Today, 11
 Jann Arden
 Band of Rascals
 Biffy Clyro - Puzzle
 Billy Joel - Storm Front
 Billy Talent - Billy Talent II
 Black Veil Brides - Black Veil Brides
 Bodyslam - Dharmajāti
 Jim Byrnes
 Carmanah
 Chevelle - Wonder What's Next
 The Cribs - Men's Needs, Women's Needs, Whatever
 Current Swell
 Danielle Marie - "Vancouver"
 Daniel Ingram - At the Gala
 Destroyer
 Alan Doyle
 Elvis Costello
 Good Charlotte - Good Morning Revival, Cardiology
 Hedley - Famous Last Words
 illScarlett - All Day With It
 Colin James
 K-os - Joyful Rebellion, Atlantis: Hymns for Disco
 Matthew Good - Hospital Music
 Metallica - Cunning Stunts
 Michelle Creber - These Boots Are Made For Walkin' (cover)
 Michael Bublé - Call Me Irresponsible, Crazy Love, Christmas, To Be Loved, Nobody but Me, Love
 The Mounties
 Dan Mangan
 Marianas Trench - Fix Me, Masterpiece Theatre
 Mother Mother - No Culture, Inside
 Mudvayne - L.D. 50
 Muse - Drones
 Nickelback - Silver Side Up, The Long Road, All The Right Reasons
 The Offspring - Days Go By
 One Bad Son
 OneRepublic - Waking Up, Native R.E.M. - Reveal, Around the Sun Reset - No Limits Rise Against - Siren Song of the Counter Culture Rodney Graham
 Shakira - Fijación Oral Vol. 1, Oral Fixation Vol. 2 Simple Plan - Still Not Getting Any... Slayer - God Hates Us All Stars - In Our Bedroom after the War The Tragically Hip - World Container Three Days Grace - Life Starts Now Veruca Salt - Eight Arms to Hold You'' 

Producers and Engineers
 Bob Clearmountain
 Brian Howes
 Brendan O'Brien
 David Bottrill
 Dave "Rave" Ogilvie
 Jaquire King
 GGGarth
 Mike Fraser
 Mutt Lange
 Eric Ratz
 Bob Rock
 Randy Staub
 Sheldon Zaharko

References

External links 
 The Warehouse Studio (official site)
 Interview with Bryan Adams by Canadian Musician
 Article on The Warehouse Studio, originally on bumph.com
 Interview with Bryan Adams, conducted by Bob Clearmountain, that appeared in Mix Magazine

1997 establishments in British Columbia
1998 establishments in Canada
Bryan Adams
Buildings and structures in Vancouver
Commercial buildings completed in 1886
Canadian companies established in 1999
Music of Vancouver
Recording studios in Canada